The Bowery Boys: New York City History is a travel and history podcast that was launched in June 2007 by Thomas Meyers and Gregory Young. Podcast episodes focus on the history of one person, place, or event in New York City history. As of December 2020, the Bowery Boys have produced 348 episodes.

History

2007–2008: Early episodes from the Bowery
While both Greg Young and Tom Meyers live in the New York City area they are both from the Midwest.  Greg Young is from Springfield, Missouri and attended Missouri State University and received as Bachelor of Journalism from the Missouri School of Journalism at the University of Missouri. in 1993. with a minor in history  Tom Meyers was born and raised in Bellevue, Ohio and graduated from Columbia College (New York) in 1997.

Young and Meyers met through  Meyers' sister Elizabeth Meyers Hendrickson who was studying journalism at the University of Missouri.

In 2007 Young and Meyers wanted to do a podcast on New York City theatre or history.  Using the app GarageBand they recorded their first podcast "NYC Cast" which was an unresearched tale about Canal Street. which was outside of Meyers apartment in the Bowery neighborhood.    Meyers said, "It was off the top of our heads — no research, just shenanigans. Quality control did not exist...We just wanted to experiment to see if it could gain any momentum."  The show quickly evolved into a more focused history podcast .

The show which was initially set in their neighborhood is also a play on the 19th-century gang the Bowery Boys and the Hollywood acting troupe The Bowery Boys.

Meyers now lives in Maplewood, New Jersey, with his husband, Guillaume Normand, and their infant son, Julien.

2009–2016: Awards and first book
In 2009 and 2011 the podcast was nominated for best travel podcast in the Podcast Awards.  The UK Daily Telegraph named the program among its list of best travel podcasts.

In 2013 NPR featured the pair on their "Morning Edition" program.

In 2014 Guides Association of New York City ("GANYC") awarded it for "Outstanding Achievement in Radio Program/Podcasts".

In June 2016 their book The Bowery Boys: Adventures in Old New York: An Unconventional Exploration of Manhattan's Historic Neighborhoods, Secret Spots and Colorful Characters was released .

2017–present: Annual Live Halloween Show and Official HBO Gilded Age Podcast
In 2017 Meyers and Young were awarded a Spotlight Award from the Mayor's Office of Media and Entertainment (MOME), recognizing their "significant contributions to the growth of NYC's thriving media and entertainment industries."

In 2018 they began hosting an annual Halloween show at Joe's Pub where they told New York ghost stories.

In 2022 Meyers was co-host on the official companion podcast for The Gilded Age (TV series) on HBO.

In addition to their podcast they host walking tours of New York and hosted events with the Municipal Art Society and LitCrawl New York.

Format
Most Bowery Boys episodes frequently take the form of a conversation between the two hosts and are often centered on a particular place or person. For instance, their 50th episode concerns the history of Collect Pond, while their 100th episodes regards the life of Robert Moses. They are also known for their annual Halloween episode, which usually focuses on New York City ghost stories, sometimes dating as far back as the 17th century. There are also shorter episodes featuring Young alone, expounding on smaller topics.

References

External links 
 

Audio podcasts
2007 podcast debuts
History podcasts
History of New York City
American podcasts